Adam Clyde Braseel (born April 5, 1983) is an American former UPS worker who spent 12 years in prison after being wrongfully convicted of a 2006 home invasion and murder in Grundy County Tennessee. In 2022, Braseel was fully exonerated by Tennessee Governor Bill Lee.

His case has been featured in popular podcasts such as This is Criminal, Generation Why, and news shows such as the Ferrier Files.

Murder and assault 
On the night of January 7, 2006, a 911 call for an assault on a female was placed by Kirk Braden at 9:52 PM. Andrew Martin West, a patrol officer with the Grundy County Sheriff's Department, drove to 60-year-old Malcolm Burrows' home on the outskirts of Tracy City on Mellisa Rock Road. His Sergeant Mike Brown arrived and found Burrows' 59-year-old sister Becky Hill badly beaten. Becky's 33-year-old son Kirk Braden told Brown he had been sleeping when he heard his mother scream. Braden said he woke up and fought off an intruder assaulting his mother. Describing the assailant as a red haired man, of medium build, someone he'd never seen before.  Hill said the same man had been at the house 30 minutes earlier and told her brother, Malcolm Burrows, that his car was broken down up the road. She said her brother drove off with the man in her Chrysler Fifth Avenue to go fix it. She said the same man came back alone and beat her. Burrows body was later found in a wooded area near the Chrysler.

Burrows' neighbor, Angela White, told investigators she had seen a “gold, shiny, new model car” parked facing towards Burrows' house.

Adam Braseel was visiting his friends the Seagroves that same weekend, at their house in Coalmont, approx. 15 miles from Tracy City. The next day Grundy County Sheriff Myers arrived at the Seagroves and confiscated the gold-colored Acura he had driven from his home in Franklin County. Myers took Braseel's photograph and several articles of clothing to be tested along with his car at the TBI Lab in Nashville. Braseel was free to go.

Sheriff Brent Myers arrested Braseel on January 18, 2006, after Kirk and Becky had identified Braseel as the intruder from photographs. Braseel was indicted for first degree murder, attempted murder, especially aggravated robbery, attempted murder, aggravated assault, aggravated burglary, and assault.

Trial

Braseel's two day trial began on November 7, 2007, at the Grundy County Court House in Altamont. Prosecutors presented their case as a calculated brutal attack to steal a wallet.

Hill testified that at approx. 9:15 PM. a red-haired man came to the house and said his car broke down and that Burrows and the man drove off in her Chrysler. She said the same man came back alone and asked her to get starting fluid from under the sink, and when she bent down to look for it, he beat her over the head with a metallic object. Her son, Braden, testified he was sleeping and woke up form his mother's screaming and fought the man off of his mother. He said the man ran out of the house and drove off in a gold colored car with a sun roof and a dent on the driver's side fender.

Hill identified Braseel as being both the man who came to the door, and the man who came back and attacked her and Braden identified Braseel as being his mother's attacker as well as identifying his car.

Burrows' neighbor, Jeff White, testified that Braden had told him when it happened that he had not seen a car at all, and said the man had run off on foot. White was certain of this as he was scared for his family there was a man running around on the loose.

Deputy Andrew West testified that Sergeant Mike Brown of the Grundy County Sheriff's department first discovered Burrows' body besides the Chrysler. TBI investigator Larry Davis was subsequently called.

Hill stated that Mr. Burrows had approximately $800 in his wallet on the night he was killed which included approximately $400 or $500 of her money which she had given to Burrows for safekeeping.

Agent Davis stated he was notified at 1:00 AM, and that when he arrived, Burrows did not have a wallet in his pocket.

Prosecutor Steve Strain in his closing attributed the stolen wallet as the motive of the murder. The jury convicted Braseel and the trial court gave him an effective sentence of life with the possibility of parole after a minimum of 51 years.

Investigation

The case is credited to be uncovered by New York crime writer and short film maker David Sale. Sale saw the efforts of Adam's sister Christina Braseel to free her brother, and worked to"uncovered significant problems in the state's evidence."

To investigate the case, Sale held auditions for a horror movie in Grundy County. Discovering new evidence, and a key mistake in the initial investigation that could reopen the case.

Sale received documents from Christina that raised doubts the motive of the brutal attack on Burrows was over a wallet. He noted that the Grundy County deputy, Sergeant Mike Brown, who found Burrows' body, had not testified at the trial. Nor had he left a report indicating whether Burrows wallet was gone or not. Mike Brown, who had retired just months after the murder, found out from his home in Florida that Sale was writing about the case, and contacted Sale through the movie's facebook page, Fear the Hills.

“Remember the stolen wallet serving as the big robbery motive? Turns out, it wasn't stolen. It was in the dead man's pants and recovered by then Grundy County Sheriff Sgt. Mike Brown. He was the first officer on the scene,” reported Dennis Ferrier, investigative report out Nashville who helped break the case.

“It stinks from the beginning,” said Brown in an interview with Ferrier. “I called the DA's office and told them I was the first officer on the scene and found the wallet and was willing to testify." Brown said he was told "they had it covered. They didn't need me." Brown did not testify at the trial.

Brown did appear at the 2019 Coram Nobis hearings, where he testified that when he found the Body of Malcolm, Burrows, his wallet was in his back pocket.  He also testified that he had submitted a report about finding the body and the wallet.

When asked by 12th Circuit Prosector Steve Strain if the sheriff's department intentionally lost his report to conceal evidence, Brown answered, “it wouldn't be unusual.” When the packed courtroom erupted in agreement.

Sale wrote extensively how the invention of the stolen wallet as a motive to kill Burrows, was to hide an obvious motive that was not brought out at trial: Burrows was a well known illicit pill dealer, while leading a dual existence as an alderman. Sale's allegations were backed up by Knoxville writer Matt Lakin: "Burrows, a convicted drug dealer and local political figure, was known to carry wads of cash."

Sale said Brown's report wasn't the only thing that went missing. As when first investigating the case back in late 2014, and looking for information,  Sale was told by the new Grundy County sheriff Clint Shrum in emails that all the files from the Braseel case were gone.

And later told to USA Today writer Matt Lakin, that when he took office, all the files were gone, “There was nothing but a pencil.” 

Sale uprooted evidence that Burrows was involved with persons involved in the pill trade who would have had motive to kill over money related to the pill trade. 
Evidence that a woman owed a large amount of money to Malcolm Burrows; Evidence that she refused to repay the money to Mr. Burrows and so he killed her horses. Evidence showing that someone was hired by Christa Garner to kill Burrows. Evidence part of a federal appeal if the first one did not work out.

Prosecutor Steve Strain at the exoneration hearing talked about the money Burrows was owed as well as what Burrows relatives had told sheriff Myers about Burrows killing her horses. He said it was a theory they fist had but dismissed when they couldn't verify any horses were killed

"The county's most notorious pill dealer gets murdered and nobody says a word on who he is," Sale said in an interview with Dennis Ferrier. Adding Adam Had no connection to these people. He was a UPS worked in a different County.

2009 Direct Appeal
Adam's first appeal was handled by his trial attorneys, it was turned down in 2010.

2015 Post conviction hearing
A petition for post-conviction relief had been filed in Grundy County Circuit Court.  When newly elected Judge Justin Angel took the bench, he decided to review it and grant an evidentiary hearing.
The case was made by his attorney that Braseel's trial lawyers did not put on an inadequate defense. As they did not motion to suppress the witness identifications of Kirk Braden and Becky Hill. They also brought out that the judge did not give the proper jury instruction
 
At the hearing, new alibi witnesses were brought to testify. Also a man who said he'd heard another man might have been hired to kill Burrows.
Judge Angel vacated Braseel's convictions on January 4, 2016, and a new trial was ordered. 
Angel ruled that single-photo eyewitness identifications were ruled unconstitutional in Tennessee, noting that Braseel's attorneys neither motioned to suppress the identification or made an objection during the trial. Judge Angel said that since the state's case hinged on the witness identifications, 
“If any other evidence whatsoever existed, then the flaws with the identification of the Petitioner would not be as important and fundamental to ensuring that the Petitioner receive a constitutionally fair trial.” 
 
Braseel was freed on bond, on January 8, 2016. He had nine months of freedom.
The prosecution appealed Angel's ruling and on October 7, 2016, the Tennessee Court of Criminal Appeals reversed his ruling and reinstated Braseel's conviction. The court opined that when Braden selected  Braseel from a single photo, because it was the first photo on the stack, it  was permissible. The appeals court also said that the judge's instructions to the jury were deficient, but harmless and would not have made a difference. 
Adam Braseel went back to prison on October 11, 2016.

This is when Sale contacted attorney Alex Little who took the case, and with the new evidence and witnesses brought to him by Sale, filed both a writ of Coram Nobis back to Judge Angel, and a Federal Habeas corpus which Justice Curtis Collier of the U.S.District Court of Eastern Tennessee ordered a stay of federal proceedings, pending outcome of what happened at the circuit court. The Federal appeal was a broader appeal where Sale's evidence that Burrows was involved in a prescription pill conspiracy could come in. Also information from a Juror who came forward on his website.

Information Entered into the federal appeal:
A statement that juror1 felt intimidated by the forman. 
The foreman stated to them and other jurors in deliberation, “Don’t worry.
If Adam is innocent, he can fix it on appeal.” After the foreman made that
statement, several jurors changed their votes to guilty.

The Coram Nobis petition was filed on May 23, 2017. It included Brown’s affidavit that when he found the body, the wallet was in his pocket.
The petition also brought out  that Sheriff Myers had altered a witness statement made by Jay Douglas. Douglas told Myers he saw a tall, white man with dark hair talking to Burrows. He was with a blonde female, in a gold or tan colored car. In his report, Myers had changed the description, writing “[Douglas] told me that the subject in the car was a white male with red hair.” Adam had red hair.  This was Information Sale had put together at the beginning, after finding the original Jay Douglas statement and publishing it on his website for all to see.

Prosecutor Steve Strain motioned Angel to recuse himself, he refused, he then motioned to bar Brown from testifying which was denied. Only when Brown was set to come testify, Strain revealed that a year and half ago, the state had re-examined a fingerprint found on the passenger side of the car Burrows drove to help the man. The print this time was matched to Kermit Bryson, an alleged killer in the 2018 slaying of Grundy County deputy Shane Tate. Bryson fled, and after a lengthy manhunt was found shot with the gun that killed him, and later died.

Alex Little Amended the appeal, and built a case around Bryson.

Coram Nobis Hearing-2015

Elizabeth Rector, at the 2019 Corum Nobis hearings, testified that Kermit Bryson told her he was part of Burrows Killing and told her he had been put up to it by a nurse practitioner.

After Brown and Rector testified, District Attorney Mike Taylor offered Adam a deal to walk out of there if he offered a plea of no contest. A deal he took to be free of the 12th Circuit.
In 2020, a hearing in front of the parole board resulted in the unanimous recommendation to the governor that he exonerate Adam Braseel. In December, 2021, Governor Bill Lee of Tennessee granted Adam Braseel a full exoneration on all charges.

Recent
Adam Braseel is currently represented by Kathleen Zellner

References

1983 births
Living people
Overturned convictions in the United States
People from Franklin County, Tennessee
American people wrongfully convicted of murder
Grundy County, Tennessee